The 2005 Tipperary Senior Hurling Championship was the 115th staging of the Tipperary Senior Hurling Championship since its establishment by the Tipperary County Board in 1887.

Toomevara were the defending champions, however, they were defeated by Thurles Sarsfields at the quarter-final stage.

On 16 October 2005, Thurles Sarsfields won the championship after a 1-17 to 0-15 defeat of Drom-Inch in the final at Semple Stadium. It was their 29th championship title overall and their first title since 1974.

Results

Preliminary round

Quarter-finals

Semi-finals

Final

Statistics

Miscellaneous
 Thurles Sarsfields win their first title since 1974.

References

Tipperary Senior Hurling Championship
Tipperary